Cunnilingus is an oral sex act performed by a person on the vulva or vagina of another person. The clitoris is the most sexually sensitive part of the human female genitalia, and its stimulation may result in a woman becoming sexually aroused or achieving orgasm.

Cunnilingus can be sexually arousing for participants and may be performed by a sexual partner as foreplay to incite sexual arousal before other sexual activities (such as vaginal or anal intercourse) or as an erotic and physically intimate act on its own. Cunnilingus can be a risk for contracting sexually transmitted infections (STIs), but the transmission risk for oral sex, especially HIV transmission, is significantly lower than for vaginal or anal sex.

Oral sex is often regarded as taboo, but most countries do not have laws which ban the practice. Commonly, heterosexual couples do not regard cunnilingus as affecting the virginity of either partner, while lesbian couples commonly do regard it as a form of virginity loss. People may also have negative feelings or sexual inhibitions about giving or receiving cunnilingus or may refuse to engage in it.

Etymology and terminology

The term cunnilingus is derived from the Latin words for the vulva (cunnus) and the verb "to lick" (lingō). There are numerous slang terms for cunnilingus, including "drinking from the furry cup", "carpet munching", and "muff-diving". Additional common slang terms used are "giving lip", "lip service", or "tipping the velvet"; this last is an expression that novelist Sarah Waters argues that she "plucked from the relative obscurity of Victorian porn". It is also popularly known in the urban community as "dining at the Y" or "DATY". A person who performs cunnilingus may be referred to as a "cunnilinguist".

Practice

General
General statistics indicate that 70–80% of women require direct clitoral stimulation to achieve orgasm. Shere Hite's research on human female sexuality reports that, for most women, orgasm is easily achieved by cunnilingus because of the direct clitoral stimulation (including stimulation to other external parts of the vulva that are physically related to the clitoris) that may be involved during the act.

A person who performs cunnilingus on someone might be referred to as the giving partner, and the other person as the receiving partner. During the activity, the receiving female's partner may use fingers to open the labia majora (genital lips) to enable the tongue to better stimulate the clitoris, or the female may separate the labia for her partner. Separating the legs wide would also usually open the vulva sufficiently for the partner to orally reach the clitoris.

Some sex manuals recommend beginning with a gentler, less focused stimulation of the labia and the whole genital area. The tip, blade, or underside of the tongue may be used, and so might the nose, chin, teeth and lips. Movements can be slow or fast, regular or erratic, firm or soft, according to the participants' preferences. The tongue can be inserted into the vagina, either stiffened or moving. The performing partner may also hum to produce vibration.

Cunnilingus may be accompanied by fingering the vagina or anus, or by the use of a sex toy; for penetration of the vagina, the aim may be to stimulate an area that may be termed "the G-spot".

Women may consider personal hygiene before practicing oral sex important, as poor hygiene can lead to odors, accumulation of sweat and micro-residue (such as lint, urine or menstrual blood), which the giving partner may find unpleasant. Some women remove or trim their pubic hair, which may enhance their oral sex experience.

Autocunnilingus, which is cunnilingus performed by a female on herself, may be possible, but an unusually high degree of flexibility is required, which may be possessed only by contortionists.

Specific positions

Any position which offers a sex partner oral access to a female's crotch area is suitable for cunnilingus, including:
In the doggy style position, the woman may crouch on all fours while her partner performs oral sex on her from behind or from below.
While facesitting, the woman may sit on or above her partner's face. In this position, she has more control over her body movements and can guide her partner or auto-stimulate against the partner's face.
While lying on her back, the woman may spread her legs or pull them up to her chest, or place them on her partner's shoulders. She may lie on any surface, such as a table or floor.
Partners may engage in mutual stimulation via the 69 position.
The woman may sit on a chair or use some other support.
During the spreadeagle position, the woman's arms and legs are spread wide.
The woman may stand while her partner is either sitting or on the knees. However, in this position the clitoris is more difficult to reach and stimulate orally. The woman may lean against a wall or hold onto furniture for support.

During menstruation
Cunnilingus may be performed during menstruation, which may be called "to earn one's red wings" in slang. The phrase is a reference to menstrual blood stains in the shape of a small bird's wings that are liable to form on the giving partner's cheeks during the act.

The red wing patch was common among the Hells Angels by the mid-1960s, and the slang term continued to be known among biker gangs in the 1980s. Gershon Legman saw the act/badge not only as functioning a homosocial tie, but also as reflecting a deep and primitive belief in the lifegiving powers of blood.

The elder Mirabeau, in his Erotika Biblion of 1783, saw cunnilingus during menstruation as an extreme act, linked with the submissive worship of the Mother goddess, and by extension to the Black Mass.

Health aspects

Sexually transmitted infections
Chlamydia, human papillomavirus (HPV), gonorrhea, syphilis, herpes, hepatitis (multiple strains), and other sexually transmitted infections (STIs) can be transmitted through oral sex. Any sexual exchange of bodily fluids with a person infected with HIV, the virus that causes AIDS, poses a risk of infection. Risk of STI infection, however, is generally considered significantly lower for oral sex than for vaginal or anal sex, with HIV transmission considered the lowest risk with regard to oral sex. Furthermore, the documented risk of HIV transmission through cunnilingus is lower than that associated with fellatio, vaginal or anal intercourse.

There is an increased risk of STI if the receiving partner has wounds on her genitals, or if the giving partner has wounds or open sores on or in his or her mouth, or bleeding gums. Brushing the teeth, flossing, or undergoing dental work soon before or after performing cunnilingus can also increase the risk of transmission, because all of these activities can cause small scratches in the lining of the mouth. These wounds, even when they are microscopic, increase the chances of contracting STIs that can be transmitted orally under these conditions. Such contact can also lead to more mundane infections from common bacteria and viruses found in, around and secreted from the genital regions. Because of the aforementioned factors, medical sources advise the use of effective barrier methods when performing or receiving cunnilingus with a partner whose STI status is unknown.

Cunnilingus during menstruation is considered high risk for the partner performing cunnilingus because there may be a high concentration of virus in menstrual blood, such as hepatitis B.

HPV and oral cancer
Links have been reported between oral sex and oral cancer with human papillomavirus (HPV)-infected people. A 2005 research study suggested that performing unprotected oral sex on a person infected with HPV might increase the risk of oral cancer. The study found that 36 percent of the cancer patients had HPV compared to only 1 percent of the healthy control group.

A 2007 study found a correlation between oral sex and throat cancer. It is believed that this is due to the transmission of HPV, a virus that has been implicated in the majority of cervical cancers and which has been detected in throat cancer tissue in numerous studies. The study concludes that people who had one to five oral sex partners in their lifetime had approximately a doubled risk of throat cancer compared with those who never engaged in this activity, and those with more than five oral sex partners had a 250 percent increased risk.

Mechanical trauma to the tongue
The lingual frenulum (underside of the tongue) is vulnerable to ulceration by repeated friction during sexual activity ("cunnilingus tongue"). Ulceration of the lingual frenulum caused by cunnilingus is horizontal, the lesion corresponding to the contact of the under surface of the tongue with the edges of the lower front teeth when the tongue is in its most forward position. This type of lesion resolves in 7–10 days, but may recur with repeated performances. Chronic ulceration at this site can cause linear fibrous hyperplasia. The incisal edges of the mandibular teeth can be smoothed to minimize the chance of trauma.

Cultural and religious views

General views

Cultural views on giving or receiving cunnilingus range from aversion to high regard. It has been considered taboo, or discouraged, in many cultures and parts of the world. In Chinese Taoism, cunnilingus is revered as a spiritually-fulfilling practice that is believed to enhance longevity.
In modern Western culture, oral sex is widely practiced among adolescents and adults. Laws of some jurisdictions regard cunnilingus as penetrative sex for the purposes of sexual offenses with regard to the act, but most countries do not have laws which ban the practice, in contrast to anal sex or extramarital sex.

People give various reasons for their dislike or reluctance to perform cunnilingus, or having cunnilingus performed on them. Some regard cunnilingus and other forms of oral sex as unnatural because the practices do not result in reproduction. Some cultures attach symbolism to different parts of the body, leading some people to believe that cunnilingus is ritually unclean or humiliating.

While commonly believed that lesbian sexual practices involve cunnilingus for all women who have sex with women, some lesbian or bisexual women dislike cunnilingus due to not liking the experience or due to psychological or social factors, such as regarding it as unclean. Other lesbian or bisexual women believe that it is a necessity or largely defines lesbian sexual activity. Lesbian couples are more likely to consider a woman's dislike of cunnilingus as a problem than heterosexual couples are, and it is common for them to seek therapy to overcome inhibitions regarding it.

Oral sex is also commonly used as a means of preserving virginity, especially among heterosexual pairings; this is sometimes termed technical virginity (which additionally includes anal sex, mutual masturbation and other non-penetrative sex acts, but excludes penile-vaginal sex). The concept of "technical virginity" or sexual abstinence through oral sex is particularly popular among teenagers. By contrast, lesbian pairings commonly consider oral sex or fingering as resulting in virginity loss, though definitions of virginity loss vary among lesbians as well.

Taoism
Cunnilingus is accorded a revered place in Taoism. This is because the practice was believed to achieve longevity, by preventing the loss of semen, vaginal and other bodily liquids, whose loss is believed to bring about a corresponding loss of vitality. Conversely, by either semen retention or ingesting the secretions from the vagina, a person can conserve and increase their ch'i, or original vital breath.

According to Philip Rawson (in Paz, p. 97), these half-poetic, half-medicinal metaphors explain the popularity of cunnilingus among people: "The practice was an excellent method of imbibing the precious feminine fluid" (Paz, p. 97). But the Taoist ideal is not just about the male's being enriched by female secretions; the female also benefits from her communion with the male, a feature that has led sinologist Kristofer Schipper to denounce the ancient handbooks on the "Art of the Bedroom" as embracing a "kind of glorified male vampirism" that is not truly Taoist at all.

See also
Anilingus
Facesitting
Fellatio

References

Further reading
 Gershon Legman: The Guilt of the Templars. Basic Books Inc., New York, 1966.
 Gershon Legman: Rationale of the Dirty Joke: An Analysis of Sexual Humor, Simon & Schuster, 1968.

 
Non-penetrative sex
Oral eroticism
Sex positions
Sexual acts
Vulva